The Amos Keyes House is a historic house in Somerville, Massachusetts.  This -story wood-frame house was built c. 1860 by Amos Keyes, a produce dealer.  It was originally located on Central Street, but was moved to this location c. 1870 when Keyes sought to build a larger house on the other site.  This house exhibits both Greek Revival and Italianate features: the round arch window in the gable is a typical Italianate detail, but the side-hall three-bay layout of the house is Greek Revival, as is the Doric porch.

The house was listed on the National Register of Historic Places in 1989.

Gallery

See also
National Register of Historic Places listings in Somerville, Massachusetts

References

Houses on the National Register of Historic Places in Somerville, Massachusetts